Gavin Andrew Mahon (born 2 January 1977) is an English former professional footballer who played as a defensive midfielder.

Mahon started his career as a trainee at Wolverhampton Wanderers, although he did not make any first-team appearances for the club. In July 1996, he joined Hereford United on a free transfer, and went on to play two-and-a-half years of regular first-team football. Mahon signed for Brentford in November 1998, for a fee that rose to £130,000. He helped the club earn promotion from Division Three during the 1998–99 season, and went on to make over 150 appearances for the west London club. He joined Watford for £150,000 in March 2002, and would later captain the club to promotion into the Premier League.

Mahon then signed for Queens Park Rangers ahead of the 2008–09 season, following a successful loan spell the previous season. Injuries hampered the latter stages of his QPR career, and he was briefly loaned out to Crystal Palace in March 2011, although he did not make any appearances for the club. Mahon signed for Notts County on a free transfer in August 2011. He was loaned to Stevenage in February 2013, for the remainder of the 2012–13 campaign. Mahon left Notts County at the end of the season, and briefly joined Portsmouth in October 2013 for a one-month spell. He signed for Tamworth in December 2013, playing for the club for the rest of the 2013–14 season in what was the final playing role of his football career.

Playing career

Early career
Mahon began his career with Wolverhampton Wanderers, where he progressed through the club's youth academy and played regularly for the youth team. He was released by Wolves at the end of the 1995–96 season, having made no first-team appearances. In July 1996, he signed for Hereford United of Division Three on a free transfer, making his first professional appearance in the club's 1–0 victory over Doncaster Rovers on 24 August 1996. Mahon scored the first goal of his career during the same season, in a 3–0 victory against Rochdale. Despite playing seven times during the early stages of the season, he did not make any further first-team appearances from November onwards, with Hereford suffering relegation to the Conference National at the end of the season. Mahon remained at Hereford for the 1997–98 season, playing in all 42 league matches as Hereford finished the season in sixth-place.

Brentford
In November 1998, Mahon signed for Division Three club Brentford, joining for a nominal fee of £50,000, which eventually increased to £130,000 under the terms of the deal. Mahon made his Brentford debut in the club's 2–1 defeat to Leyton Orient at Brisbane Road on 21 November 1998, and played regularly in central midfield. He opened his goalscoring account for Brentford in the club's first match of 1999, scoring the third goal in a 3–1 win over Barnet at Griffin Park. His first season with the club proved to be a successful one, with Brentford earning promotion to Division Two as champions, winning the league by four points. Mahon made 32 appearances during the season, contributing with four goals. The 1999–00 season was Mahon's first full season with the west London club, making 44 appearances in all competitions and scoring three times, as Brentford consolidated their place in Division Two with a mid-table finish.

Mahon played regularly during the 2000–01 season, making 51 appearances in league and cup competitions, as Brentford once again finished in mid-table. He scored once that season, scoring the equalising goal in an away game against Bristol City in December 2000, a match that Brentford went on to win 2–1. He was also named in the starting line-up for the first competitive final of his career, as Brentford lost 2–1 to Port Vale in the Football League Trophy Final. Mahon received the first red card of his career that season; he was sent-off in the 83rd-minute in a 1–0 home defeat to Swindon Town on 11 April 2002. His fourth consecutive season at Brentford started well, with the club going on an eight-match unbeaten start to the season. He made 39 appearances during the season, and was named Brentford's Player of the Year for the campaign despite leaving the west London club three months before the end of the season. During his three-and-a-half years at Brentford, Mahon made 166 appearances in all competitions, scoring eight goals.

Watford
In March 2002, Mahon signed for Division One club Watford for an initial fee of £150,000. The move came about as a result of Watford reserve team manager Ray Lewington, who had previously signed Mahon at Brentford, recommending the player to new manager Gianluca Vialli. Vialli subsequently went to watch him play, and opted to make Mahon his first signing for the club. On signing for Watford, Mahon stated – "As soon as I knew Watford were interested I was ready to jump at the chance". He made his Watford debut on 9 March 2002, playing the whole match in a 2–0 away victory against Crystal Palace. Mahon went on to make a further five appearances for the club during the remainder of the 2001–02 season. Ahead of the 2002–03 season, under the management of Lewington once again following Vialli's sacking, Mahon was one of several players who took a voluntary pay cut as a result Watford's financial troubles. Shortly before the start of pre-season, Watford stated that Mahon was going to miss the opening months of the new campaign after sustaining a knee injury in May 2002. After playing in the reserve team for two months to gain fitness, Mahon returned to the first-team in the club's 2–1 win over Burnley at Vicarage Road on 30 November 2002, and went on to make 22 appearances during the campaign. Five of those appearances were in Watford's FA Cup run, as they lost 2–1 in the semi-final to Southampton at Villa Park.

Mahon played in the club's opening game of the 2003–04 season, a 1–0 home victory over AFC Bournemouth in the League Cup, and remained ever-present during the first two months of the campaign. An injury in the club's 1–0 away victory against Crewe Alexandra on 4 October 2003 ultimately ruled Mahon out for two months. In January 2004, Mahon scored his first goal for Watford, scoring with a header to give the club a brief lead over Premier League club Chelsea in the Third Round of the FA Cup, in an eventual 2–2 draw. He added to his goal tally twice during the second half of the season, in home matches against Sunderland and Derby County respectively. The goals meant Mahon had scored three times during a season that produced another mid-table finish, making 36 appearances in all competitions. Shortly after the season had finished, he was voted as the club's Player of the Season. Two months into the 2004–05 season, in October 2004, Mahon signed a new three-year contract extension with the club, keeping him at Watford until 2007. On Mahon signing the new deal, Lewington stated – "I've known Gavin a long time and it doesn't surprise me that he's become a very important part of our squad". He made 51 appearances during the season. Watford narrowly avoided relegation by two points under the new management of Aidy Boothroyd, after picking up seven points from their final three matches.

Following the departure of previous captain Sean Dyche, Mahon was appointed club captain ahead of the 2005–06 season. Watford began the season strongly, with Mahon scoring his first goal of the new campaign in a 3–1 home victory against Burnley on 20 August 2005. Watford exceeded expectations during the season, with Mahon's leadership playing a key role in guiding Watford's young squad to a third-place finish. Mahon played in all three play-off matches as Watford defeated Crystal Palace 3–0 on aggregate in the semi-finals, before defeating Leeds United by a 3–0 scoreline in the final at the Millennium Stadium on 21 May 2006. The victory meant Watford had earned promotion to the Premier League in Mahon's first season as captain, during which he made 43 appearances. Mahon signed a two-year contract extension with the club on 18 July 2006. He subsequently started in the club's first game since their return to the Premier League, playing the whole match as Watford lost 2–1 to Everton at Goodison Park. Mahon made 38 appearances during the season, scoring once with a "fierce volley" in a 4–2 victory against Portsmouth, a goal that was nominated for April's Goal of the Month award. Watford were relegated back to the Championship after finishing in 20th position. The club made the FA Cup semi-final that campaign, losing 4–1 to Manchester United at Villa Park, with Mahon playing in three of Watford's five FA Cup ties that campaign.

With the club back in the Championship for the 2007–08 season, Mahon continued to play regularly during the first half of the season, making 19 appearances. However, in December 2007, manager Aidy Boothroyd told Mahon that he wanted to build a squad that was ready for the Premier League, and that Mahon did not feature in his future plans. Mahon stated – "I said to Aidy that I wanted to stay, at least until the end of the season. I wanted to get a second promotion in three years on my CV. Aidy explained his reasons why, and I have no grudges with him for that". Mahon left Watford when the club were in first place in the Championship, although they would ultimately finish in sixth position. Boothroyd later stated that he regretted letting Mahon leave "too early". During his five-and-a-half-year spell with Watford, Mahon made 215 appearances and scored seven goals.

Queens Park Rangers
Mahon subsequently joined Championship rivals Queens Park Rangers on an 'emergency loan' basis on 31 December 2007, with a view to a permanent transfer at the end of the season. QPR beat "four or five other Championship sides" to his signature. Watford received an initial payment of £200,000 for Mahon, with an additional £50,000 due on further clauses. Although disappointed by his sudden exit at Watford, Mahon stated it was "a very exciting time to be joining" QPR, and that "the ambition and drive of the board and the new investors really impressed me and I'm delighted to be here". He made his debut a day after signing, coming on as a 67th-minute substitute in the club's 3–1 win over Leicester City at Loftus Road. Mahon scored his first goal for the club on 12 February 2008, the opening goal of the match as QPR squandered a two-goal lead to lose 4–2 at home to Burnley. He made 17 appearances during the second half of the season, with QPR finishing the season in 14th place. Mahon signed for the club on a permanent basis at the end of the season.

Under the new management of Iain Dowie, Mahon and QPR began the 2008–09 season with five victories in their first six matches. Mahon scored his first goal of the season in a 1–0 home victory over Cardiff City on 8 November 2008, coming on as a 67th-minute substitute, before scoring a headed goal against a nine-man Cardiff side with just 10 minutes remaining. The goal was highlighted in the BBC documentary The Four Year Plan, as joint-owner Flavio Briatore ordered sporting director Gianni Paladini into "going down to the touchline to order caretaker manager Gareth Ainsworth to bring Gavin Mahon off the bench. Mahon promptly scores a last gasp winner and Briatore, his football genius now proven, erupts in a mixture of self-righteous anger and joy in the directors' box". His second goal of the season came in April 2009, scoring with a diving header to equalise in a match QPR had trailed by two goals to Sheffield Wednesday, with Mahon atoning for his earlier own goal. QPR went on to win the match 3–2, all of their goals coming in the last half-hour of the match. He played under three different managers during the season, making 40 appearances as the club finished in mid-table.

Mahon started in QPR's opening game of the 2009–10 season on 8 August 2009, playing the whole match as the club drew 1–1 at home to Blackpool. He played regularly in the opening months of the campaign, making nine appearances in all competitions, scoring once, with QPR winning seven of the games. He suffered a knee injury in November 2009, which would ultimately rule him out for the remainder of the season. With Mahon's contract expiring at the end of the season, manager Neil Warnock stated – "He'll probably come back and do a pre-season with us and try and show me what he can do. I've always liked Gavin, we've just got to wait and see who's available". Despite being released at the 2009–10 campaign, he re-joined the club in October 2010 on a one-month contract, describing the move as being "like a trial". Although he did not make any further first-team appearances for QPR, the monthly deal was extended on four occasions.

He joined Championship club Crystal Palace on loan until the end of the 2010–11 season on 24 March 2011. On the loan deal, Mahon stated – "I'm very much pleased to have joined. It's been stop-start for me this season and I need to be playing in and amongst the first team. If I can give some input off the pitch as well as on it that will be great". He did not make any appearances during the loan spell and returned to his parent club in May 2011. A month after his return, Mahon was one of eight players to be released by QPR. During his time at the club, he scored four goals in 66 appearances.

Notts County
Ahead of the 2011–12 season, Mahon joined former club Watford for pre-season training in order to regain fitness ahead of the new season. Although no transfer materialised, he played for Watford against Brentford in a friendly at the end of July 2011, and stated he "really appreciated the opportunity" Watford gave him to train with the club.

Two weeks into the new season, on 25 August 2011, Mahon signed for League One club Notts County on an initial pay-as-you-play deal. He made his debut for the club two days later as Notts County lost 2–0 away to Preston North End. Mahon impressed manager Martin Allen during his first month with the club, and Allen wished to secure a longer deal for the player – "The manager called me a few weeks ago and said he'd like to try to extend the deal to the end of the season". Mahon signed an 18-month contract with Notts County on 13 October 2012, keeping him contracted to the club until the summer of 2013. He was described as a "pivotal" player in Notts County's season, and went on to make 34 appearances as they missed out on a play-off place on goal difference. At the end of the season, Notts County stated they wanted to retain Mahon's services, and the player was offered a new one-year contract, which he signed on 28 June 2012.

Mahon began his second season at Notts County playing predominantly as a substitute, making six starting appearances and a further nine as a substitute during the first half of the season. In November 2012, it was revealed that Mahon was the subject of loan bids from two League Two sides in the form of Bristol Rovers and Port Vale. He rejected the opportunity of going out on loan after Notts County manager Keith Curle told him there was still of chance of him regaining his first-team place. However, two weeks later, Mahon stated he was prepared to leave Meadow Lane if he did not play more games – "You do think like that sometimes, when you travel halfway across the country to get splinters in your backside, but that's football, you have to wait for your chance to come. I told him the last thing I want to do is leave a club like Notts, but when you get to my age you have got to play, especially if you want to go on and play next season".

In February 2013, Mahon joined fellow League One club Stevenage on a loan agreement for the remainder of the 2012–13 season. He made his Stevenage debut in the club's 2–1 away defeat to Shrewsbury Town on 23 February, playing the whole match. Mahon went on to make nine appearances for the club during the two-month loan spell. Mahon was released by Notts County at the end of the 2012–13 campaign.

Portsmouth
Mahon was without a club for the first two months of the 2013–14 season, eventually signing for League Two club Portsmouth on a one-month contract on 4 October 2013. He made his Portsmouth debut four days after signing, playing the whole match in a 2–1 Football League Trophy away win at Oxford United. Mahon was sent-off in a 2–1 defeat to former club Stevenage in an FA Cup tie on 9 November 2013, receiving a straight red card for an elbow on Filipe Morais. He made three appearances during his brief spell at Portsmouth, leaving upon the expiry of his contract on 28 November 2013.

Tamworth
In December 2013, Mahon joined Conference Premier club Tamworth on a short-term deal until the end of the 2013–14 season. He made his debut for Tamworth in the club's 2–0 home victory over Halifax Town on 4 January 2014, playing the whole match. Mahon played regularly for Tamworth during the second half of the campaign, starting in all of the 23 games he played in. He left Tamworth upon the expiry of his contract in May 2014.

Ahead of the 2014–15 season, Mahon was invited to spend time on trial at Barnet, and he played in a pre-season friendly fixture against Peterborough United in July 2014. No transfer materialised and Mahon subsequently retired from playing, opting to work for a sports consultancy company.

Style of play
Mahon was predominantly deployed as a defensive midfielder throughout his career. He was described by his former teammate at Notts County, Alan Judge, as being a "pivotal point" in the centre of midfield due to his desire to play the ball on the floor, as well as being calm on the ball.

Personal life
Mahon has two children called Mia and Alfie. He supports Birmingham City.

After his retirement from playing, Mahon joined the Stellar Group, a sports consultancy company. He undertakes the role of Football Intermediary, a position to help pass on his knowledge and understanding to younger players that have been signed by Stellar.

Career statistics

A.  The "League" column constitutes appearances and goals (including those as a substitute) in the Football League and Football Conference.
B.  The "Other" column constitutes appearances and goals (including those as a substitute) in the FA Trophy, Football League Trophy and play-offs.

Honours
Brentford
 Football League Third Division: 1998–99

Watford
 Football League Championship play-offs: 2006

Individual
 Watford Player of the Year: 2003–04

References

External links

1977 births
Footballers from Birmingham, West Midlands
Living people
English footballers
Association football midfielders
Wolverhampton Wanderers F.C. players
Hereford United F.C. players
Brentford F.C. players
Watford F.C. players
Queens Park Rangers F.C. players
Crystal Palace F.C. players
Notts County F.C. players
Stevenage F.C. players
Portsmouth F.C. players
Tamworth F.C. players
Premier League players
English Football League players